Physics is a natural science that studies matter and the forces that act upon it.

Physics may also refer to:

Journals
 Physics (American Physical Society journal), former name of the Journal of Applied Physics, published by the American Physical Society
 Physics (American Physical Society magazine), also published by the American Physical Society
 Physics (Chinese Physical Society journal), or Wuli , published by the Chinese Physical Society
 Physics (MDPI journal), published by MDPI
 Physics Physique Физика, a small journal that ran from 1964–1968 published by Physics Publishing, often simply referred to as Physics.

Other uses
 Physics (Aristotle), a key text in the philosophy of Aristotle
 Physics (band), an American rock music group
 Physics (magazine)

 Aristotelian physics, the natural science described in the works of Aristotle
 Theoretical physics
 PhysX, a physics engine for computer games made by Nvidia

See also 
 
 
 Physic (disambiguation)
 Psychic (disambiguation)